Fatal Passage: The Untold Story of John Rae, the Arctic Adventurer Who Discovered the Fate of Franklin is a book by Canadian historian and writer Ken McGoogan. It was first published in 2001. The book formed the basis for the 2008 movie Passage from the National Film Board of Canada.

Synopsis 

In 1854, the explorer John Rae found himself at the centre of one of the great controversies of the nineteenth century – the fate of the Franklin expedition. With the British hoping to be first in the race to discover the Northwest Passage, the news Rae brought of starvation and cannibalism among final survivors set off a firestorm that would eclipse his own incredible accomplishments. The true story of the remarkable John Rae – Arctic traveler and Hudson's Bay Company doctor – Fatal Passage tells a tale of imperial ambition and high adventure.

When nineteen-year-old Rae set sail for Hudson Bay in 1833, he had little idea of what to expect at the edge of empire. Meeting his first winter at Moose Factory with equanimity, even as members of the crew were dying despite his best efforts, he discovered that the key to successful Arctic life was to learn the survival skills of the native peoples. The hardy Rae, raised in the windswept Orkney Islands of northern Scotland, and a gifted hunter and sailor, would become one of the greatest explorers of his generation. He would survey 1765 miles of uncharted territory, travel 6555 miles on snowshoes and sail 6700 miles in small boats. Building on the work of explorers who had gone before him and aided by only a handful of native people, Métis and Scots, Rae became the consummate Arctic explorer, as much at ease in the wilderness of ice as in London drawing rooms.

Ultimately, he solved the two great mysteries of nineteenth-century Arctic exploration. Rae discovered both the fate of the lost expedition of Sir John Franklin, which had sailed from England in 1845, and the last navigable link in the Northwest Passage. The first of these discoveries brought down upon him the wrath of the formidable Lady Franklin, who enlisted the help of Charles Dickens, and orchestrated the erasure of Rae from official Arctic history. In Fatal Passage, Ken McGoogan sets the record straight.

Awards 
Drainie-Taylor Biography Prize
The Canadian Authors' Association History Award
American Christopher Award.

Editions 
 McGoogan, Ken (2002). Fatal Passage: The True Story of John Rae, the Arctic Hero Time Forgot. Toronto, HarperCollins publishers ltd.

See also
Lady Franklin's Revenge

2001 non-fiction books
21st-century history books
British biographies
Canadian biographies